The 1905 Cooper vs. Fairmount football game was a college football game between  (now Sterling College) and  (now Wichita State University) played on October 6, 1905, at Association Field in Wichita  The game was played at night under gas lamps as a demonstration by the Coleman Company and was the first night football game played west of the Mississippi River.  Fairmount won by a score of 24–0.

Aftermath
Several other attempts had been made in the eastern United States toward the means of playing football at night, beginning in 1892 with the first night football game that ended at halftime.  Since that game, other attempts in the east grew to be successful, but this was the first time such an attempt was made west of the Mississippi River. The use of lighting was considered successful.

See also
1892 Wyoming Seminary vs. Mansfield State Normal football game
1905 college football season
List of historically significant college football games
Timeline of college football in Kansas

References

1905 college football season
vs. Cooper 1905
vs. Fairmount 1905
1905 in sports in Kansas
October 1905 sports events